ROCS Di Hua (PFG-1206) is a Kang Ding-class frigate of the Republic of China Navy.

Development and design 
As the ROC (Taiwan)'s defensive stance is aimed towards the Taiwan Strait, the ROC Navy is constantly seeking to upgrade its anti-submarine warfare capabilities. The US$1.75 billion agreement with France in the early 1990s was an example of this procurement strategy, the six ships are configured for both ASW and surface attack. The Exocet was replaced by Taiwan-developed Hsiung Feng II anti-ship missile and the AAW weapon is the Sea Chaparral. The main gun is an Oto Melara 76 mm/62 mk 75 gun, similar to its Singaporean counterparts, the Formidable-class frigates. Some problems in the integration of Taiwanese and French systems had been reported. The frigate carries a single Sikorsky S-70C(M)-1/2 ASW helicopter.

The Sea Chaparral SAM system is considered inadequate for defense against aircraft and anti-ship missiles, so the ROC (Taiwan) Navy plans to upgrade its air-defense capabilities with the indigenous TC-2N in 2020. The AMRAAM missiles will be quad-packed in a vertical launch system for future ROCN surface combatants, but a less-risky alternative arrangement of above-deck, fixed oblique launchers is seen as more likely for upgrading these French-built frigates.

Construction and career 
Di Hua was launched on 27 November 1995 at the DCNS in Lorient. Commissioned on 14 August 1997.

On 13 July 2016, in response to the South China Sea arbitration case, the then President of the Republic of China, Tsai Ing-wen, was accompanied by Defense Minister Feng Shikuan and Navy Commander Huang Shuguang to inspect Di Hua at about 9 a.m., leaving Zuoying Naval Base at 11 a.m. and heading for the South China Sea Carry out patrol task.

Gallery

References 

1995 ships
Ships built in France
Kang Ding-class frigates